The Tête de Balme (2,321 m) is a mountain of the Mont Blanc Massif, located on the border between Switzerland and France. It lies on the range north of the Col de Balme, culminating at the Croix de Fer.

References

External links
 Tête de Balme on Hikr

Mountains of the Alps
Mountains of Valais
Mountains of Haute-Savoie
France–Switzerland border
International mountains of Europe
Mountains of Switzerland
Two-thousanders of Switzerland